Hawthorne High School and Middle School is a grades 6-12 public high school and middle school in Hawthorne, Florida, United States.

Athletics 
Hawthorne High and Middle School offers many different sports, including basketball, baseball, cheerleading, football, softball, volleyball, and track.

In 2020, Hawthorne High School won Florida state championships in division 1A for both its girls and boys basketball teams, while its football team also advanced to the state championship game for the first time in the school's history.  Hawthorne's football team appeared in the state championship in both the 2020 and 2021 seasons.

Notable alumni 
Cornelius Ingram, American football player, Philadelphia Eagles (2009–2011), University of Florida (2004–09)
Kevin Lynum, American college basketball coach, Florida A&M University (2018–2020), Norfolk State University (2022–Present)

References

External links 
 

High schools in Alachua County, Florida
Public high schools in Florida
Public middle schools in Florida